Hold You is the third album by Jamaican reggae singer Gyptian. The album was released on 25 October 2010 by CD and 12 October by Digital download.

Singles
 "Hold You" was the first single released from the album, it released on the 7 November 2010 in the UK. The song has reached #69 in Canada, #77 in the United States and #16 on the UK Singles Chart.

Track listing

Chart performance

Release history

References

2010 albums
VP Records albums
Gyptian albums